Nicușor Fota (born 1 December 1996) is a Romanian professional footballer who plays as a full-back and left midfield for Liga III club CSM Reșița.

Honours
Rapid București
Liga II: 2015–16
CSM Reșița
Liga III: 2021–22

References

External links

Living people
People from Caracal, Romania
1996 births
Romanian footballers
Association football midfielders
Liga I players
CS Concordia Chiajna players
Liga II players
FC Rapid București players
LPS HD Clinceni players
Liga III players
CSM Reșița players